The Apple Thunderbolt Display is a 27-inch flat panel computer monitor developed and sold by Apple Inc. from July 2011 to June 2016. Originally priced at $999, it replaced the 27-inch Apple LED Cinema Display. New to the Thunderbolt Display was the switch from Mini DisplayPort and USB to a single Thunderbolt connector for data and DisplayPort. The Thunderbolt Display also added a Gigabit Ethernet port and FireWire 800 port. Macs released before 2011 without Thunderbolt, the 2012 Mac Pro and the single USB-C Retina MacBook are incompatible with the Thunderbolt Display without use of additional adaptors.

The Thunderbolt Display was discontinued in June 2016, and replaced by LG UltraFine displays developed with LG on the consumer end, while the Pro Display XDR succeeded it in 2019 as Apple's professional display. In 2022, the Apple Studio Display was released as the first Apple-branded consumer display since its discontinuation.



Overview
Like its predecessor, the 27-inch LED Cinema Display, the resolution is 2560×1440 pixels in a 16:9 aspect ratio. It was made with aluminum and glass, having a similar appearance to the contemporary ranges of iMac and MacBook Pro unibody designs. The display featured a built-in 720p FaceTime HD camera (replacing the iSight in the previous model), microphone, and stereo speaker system with subwoofer (2.1 channel). An octopus cable with Thunderbolt and MagSafe is permanently attached to the back of the display for data and charging MacBooks, respectively. On the rear of the display there is a Thunderbolt port, a FireWire 800 port, three USB 2.0 ports and a Gigabit Ethernet port.

The Thunderbolt port allows for the possibility of daisy chaining Thunderbolt Displays from a supported Mac, or connecting other devices that have Thunderbolt ports, such as external hard drives and video capture devices. In July 2012, Apple began including a MagSafe to MagSafe 2 adaptor in the box.

Discontinuation and successors 
On June 23, 2016, Apple announced through a statement that it was discontinuing the Thunderbolt Display and would no longer produce stand-alone displays, saying, "There are a number of great third-party options available for Mac users." Apple subsequently worked with LG to design the Thunderbolt 3-enabled UltraFine line, consisting of 4K and 5K displays, which were the only displays sold by Apple from 2016 to 2019. In December 2019, Apple released the Pro Display XDR, the first Apple-branded display since the Thunderbolt Display's discontinuation. In March 2022, Apple released the Apple Studio Display, the first Apple-branded consumer display since the Thunderbolt Display's discontinuation, which similarly includes integrated speakers and a webcam.

Backward and forward compatibility
The Thunderbolt Display drops compatibility with all previous standards, including VGA, DVI, and DisplayPort. It is not compatible with computers that do not have a Thunderbolt port, including pre-2011 Macs and the vast majority of desktop PCs. The 12-inch Retina MacBook and 2012 Mac Pro do not support Thunderbolt.

Macs released after 2016 with Thunderbolt 3 and later, which uses a USB-C connector, are compatible using Apple's Thunderbolt 3-to-2 adapter.

Using multiple displays

MacBook Pro
 Macbook Pro (2011): 2 Displays: Can daisy chain two Apple Thunderbolt Displays together to get two displays, but the laptop's LCD may turn off.
 Macbook Pro (2012): 2+2 Displays: Can daisy chain two Apple Thunderbolt Displays, in addition to one HDMI display and the MacBook Pro's own display, for four displays total
 MacBook Pro (Late 2016): Apple released a Thunderbolt 3 to Thunderbolt 2 Adapter for enabling the Thunderbolt 3 ports of MacBook Pro (Late 2016) to connect to Thunderbolt 2 devices.
 MacBook Pro (2017-2019) Using 2 of the Thunderbolt 3 to Thunderbolt 2 Adapters can run 4 Thunderbolt Displays in addition to the built in Retina Display for a total of 5.
 MacBook Pro M1 Pro (2021) Using 1 of the Thunderbolt 3 to Thunderbolt 2 Adapters can run 2 Thunderbolt Displays in addition to the built in Retina Display for a total of 3.
 MacBook Pro M1 Max (2021) Using 2 of the Thunderbolt 3 to Thunderbolt 2 Adapters can run 4 Thunderbolt Displays in addition to the built in Retina Display for a total of 5.

MacBook Air
 MacBook Air (Mid 2011): 1+1 Displays: Can use one Apple Thunderbolt display, in addition to the MacBook Air's own display.
 MacBook Air (Mid 2012 to Mid 2017): 2+1 Displays: Can daisy chain two Apple Thunderbolt displays, in addition to the MacBook Air's own display.
 MacBook Air (Intel, Late 2018 to Early 2020): 2+1 Displays: Can daisy chain two Apple Thunderbolt displays, in addition to the MacBook Air's own display.
 MacBook Air (M1, 2020): 1+1 Displays: Can use one Apple Thunderbolt Display (with Thunderbolt 3 to Thunderbolt 2 adapter), in addition to the MacBook Air's own display. Further displays have to rely on virtual display output like DisplayLink or Apple Sidecar.

Mac Pro
 Mac Pro (Late 2013): 6 Displays: Can run six Apple Thunderbolt Displays using six Thunderbolt ports.

Mac mini
 Mac mini (Mid 2011): 1 Display.  2 Displays daisy chained: AMD version
 Mac mini (Late 2012): 2 Displays daisy chained.
 Mac mini (Late 2014): 2 Displays.
 Mac mini (2018): 2 Displays using TB3 to TB2 converter.
 Mac mini (2020): 1 Display using TB3 to TB2 converter.

Technical specifications

See also
 Apple displays
 Apple Studio Display (1998-2004)
 Apple Cinema Display (1999-2011)
 Apple Pro Display XDR (2019-current)
 Apple Studio Display (2022-current)

References

External links
 – official site at Apple
Apple Thunderbolt Display – 27-inch user manual at Apple

Apple Inc. monitors
Apple Inc. peripherals